Federal elections were held in Belgium on 25 May 2014. All 150 members of the Chamber of Representatives were elected, whereas the Senate was no longer directly elected following the 2011–2012 state reform. These were the first elections held under King Philippe's reign.

Date
As part of the state reform adopted 19 December 2013, the date of election will from now on coincide with the European elections, which the Council of the EU has scheduled for 22–25 May 2014. The regional elections in Belgium already constitutionally coincide with the European elections, consequently Belgians will vote for three elections on the same day.

On 25 April 2014, a declaration to amend the Constitution was adopted, formally dissolving parliament and triggering new elections within 40 days.

Electoral system
</div>

The 150 members of the Chamber of Representatives are elected in 11 multi-member constituencies, being the ten provinces and Brussels, with between 4 and 24 seats. Seats are allocated using the d'Hondt method, with an electoral threshold of 5% per constituency. Apportionment of seats is done every ten years, last by royal order of 31 January 2013, based on the population figures of 28 May 2012.

Representatives elected from the five Flemish Region provinces, Antwerp (24), East Flanders (20), Flemish Brabant (15), Limburg (12) and West Flanders (16), automatically belong to the Dutch-speaking language group in parliament, whereas those elected from the five provinces of Wallonia, Hainaut (18), Liège (15), Luxembourg (4), Namur (6) and Walloon Brabant (5), form the French-speaking language group. The 15 members elected in Brussels may choose to join either group, though de facto only French-speaking parties reach the threshold.

The 60-member Senate is composed of 50 representatives from the regional and community parliaments, plus 10 co-opted senators proportionally divided among parties based on the result of the federal election.

Voters
All Belgian citizens aged 18 or over are obligated to participate in the election. Foreigners residing in Belgium (regardless of EU citizenship) cannot vote, whereas Belgian citizens living abroad may register to vote. Following the sixth state reform, they can no longer freely choose in which constituency their vote counts; instead the municipality is objectively defined by statutory criteria. Since the previous elections were snap elections, there was more preparation time now, allowing for significantly increased use of the option compared to 2010.

The electoral roll was fixed per 1 March 2014.

151 Flemish municipalities and 2 Brussels municipalities voted electronically; the remaining 157 Flemish and 17 Brussels and all 262 Walloon municipalities voted by paper ballot.

Timetable

Background and reforms since last election

The previous 2010 election resulted in a victory for Flemish nationalist N-VA. The coalition formation stalemate went on for a record-breaking 541 days. Eventually, the negotiating parties agreed upon a sixth Belgian state reform and the Di Rupo Government was finally formed on 6 December 2011 and comprised PS, MR, CD&V, Open VLD, sp.a and cdH.

The state reform has the following consequences for the election in 2014:
 The controversial electoral constituency of Brussels-Halle-Vilvoorde no longer exists; rather, each province plus the federal capital now has its own constituency, and voter discrimination has been abolished.
 The Senate will no longer be directly elected.
 The term length will be increased from 4 years to 5 years, and the election will always coincide with the European Parliament election.

Election campaign
The campaign topics largely focused on socio-economic reforms: job creation and unemployment, tax reform, pensions, ... This campaign also featured an unprecedented level of quantified programmes by political parties. For example, the N-VA released its "V plan" and CD&V its "3D plan".

One week before the election day, former CD&V Prime Minister Jean-Luc Dehaene suddenly died while in France. Several debates were cancelled, and CD&V as well as all other Flemish parties suspended their campaign for a few days.

Jewish Museum shooting 
On 24 May, the day before the elections, a shooting occurred at the Belgian Jewish Museum in Brussels, with three people reported dead. Self-described anti-Zionist MP Laurent Louis suggested that the attack could be a false flag operation seeking to discredit him and his political party (Debout les Belges, or "Stand Up, Belgians") on the eve of the elections.

Political parties

Current situation 
In 2010, ten parties won seats in the Belgian Senate: Christen-Democratisch en Vlaams (CD&V), Centre Démocrate Humaniste (cdH), Socialistische Partij Anders (sp.a), Parti Socialiste (PS), Open Vld, Mouvement Réformateur (MR), Groen, Ecolo, New Flemish Alliance (N-VA) and Vlaams Belang. In the Chamber of Representatives, the People's Party (PP) and Libertarian, Direct, Democratic (LDD) each also won one seat.

During the legislation, the Francophone Democratic Federalists (FDF) separated from the MR party and are now represented in the Chamber with 3 representatives, but have no Senators. The PP Member of Parliament left the party and became an independent. One Vlaams Belang member of the Chamber and one Vlaams Belang member of the Senate left their party and decided to become independents.

Thus, currently the ten major parties are represented in both the Chamber and the Senate; in addition, LDD and FDF are represented in the Chamber of Representatives.

However, most of the major parties only operate in the Dutch-speaking or in the French-speaking constituencies. Voters who live in the provinces of Antwerp, East Flanders, Flemish Brabant, Limburg or West Flanders can only vote for CD&V, Groen, N-VA, Open VLD, sp.a and Vlaams Belang, apart from the minor parties – except when a French-speaking party would present a list in one of these provinces, which has not happened except for a FDF and a PP list in Flemish Brabant. In the provinces of Hainaut, Liège, Luxembourg, Namur and Walloon Brabant, voters can only vote for cdH, Ecolo, MR and PS, apart from the minor parties – except when a Dutch-speaking party would present a list in one of these provinces, which has not happened in this elections.

In the constituency of Liège, the German-speaking parties CSP, Ecolo, PFF and SP all form one list with their French-speaking counterparts; the name of these lists only mention the French-speaking party. Therefore, the CSP politicians are on the cdH list, the Ecolo ones on the Ecolo list, PFF on the MR list and SP on the PS list. The other German-speaking parties (ProDG and Vivant) do not present a list due to their marginal chance of getting a seat in Parliament.

In the constituency of Brussels-Capital, Ecolo and Groen formed one list under the name Ecolo. CD&V, N-VA, Open Vld, sp.a and Vlaams Belang will each present a single list.

LDD only presented a list in West Flanders. FDF presented a list in all Walloon constituencies, in Brussels-Capital and in Flemish Brabant. PVDA-PTB presented a list in all eleven constituencies of Belgium, making it one of the few parties which are represented in the whole of Belgium.

Main candidates 

The following candidates are the first on the respective party list (lijsttrekker / tête de liste) per constituency.

Flemish-speaking constituencies

French-speaking constituencies

Opinion polling 
The results of the opinion polls are usually split into separate numbers for the three Belgian regions. Below, they are transposed to national figures.

Results
At the Flemish side, Vlaams Belang and LDD suffered major losses; their votes went to N-VA, which increased its position as largest party. CD&V, Open Vld and Groen gained slightly as well, while sp.a lost slightly.

At the French-speaking side, PS, cdH and Ecolo suffer losses while MR gained as well as newcomers PTB-GO! and FDF.

In detail

Government formation 

On 27 May, King Philippe nominated Bart De Wever (N-VA) as informateur, meaning he is tasked with finding enough points of agreement for a possible coalition.

After five months of discussions, a centre-right coalition of four parties (CD&V, Open Vld, MR and N-VA) came to agreement on 7 October with Walloon Charles Michel as prime minister. Yet it is a Flanders-focused coalition that excludes Socialists from the government for the first time in 26 years. Michel would be Belgium's youngest prime minister after the 28 hours of discussions over achieving a balanced budget by 2018. The announcement was made by party colleague and Budget Minister Olivier Chastel on Twitter: "Charles Michel becomes prime minister."

References

External links
 2014 elections, belgium.be

2014 elections in Belgium
May 2014 events in Europe
Federal elections in Belgium